Liu Shangkun (Chinese: 刘尚坤; born 29 January 1992 in Jinzhou) is a Chinese football player who currently plays for Chinese Super League side Wuhan Zall.

Club career
Liu Shangkun joined the Shandong Luneng Football Academy in 2007 and played for their youth team until in 2011, Liu joined Tianjin Songjiang in the China League One after unsuccessful trials with Guangzhou Evergrande, Shenyang Dongjin and Hunan Billows. After two seasons with the club in November 2012, Liu transferred to Chinese Super League side Wuhan Zall. He made his Super League debut for Wuhan on 13 April 2013 in a game against Changchun Yatai, coming on as a substitute for Yao Hanlin in the 91st minute.

On 7 January 2016, Liu transferred to his hometown club Liaoning Whowin. He would make his debut on 6 March 2016 in a league game against Shijiazhuang Ever Bright F.C. that ended in a 1-0 victory. He would go on to become a regular within the team, but was also part of the squad that saw the club relegated at the end of the 2017 Chinese Super League campaign. He left the club after they were dissolved on 23 May 2020 due to wage arrears.

On 17 July 2020, Liu returned to Chinese Super League side Wuhan Zall. His return appearance would be in a league game on 12 August 2020 against Shanghai SIPG F.C. that ended in a 2-1 defeat.

Career statistics 
Statistics accurate as of match played 31 December 2020.

References

External links
 

1992 births
Living people
Chinese footballers
Footballers from Liaoning
People from Jinzhou
Tianjin Tianhai F.C. players
Wuhan F.C. players
Liaoning F.C. players
Chinese Super League players
China League One players
Association football defenders